The Delectable Country is an historical novel by the American writer Leland Baldwin (1897–1981) set in Pittsburgh, Pennsylvania.

The Whiskey Rebellion is brewing in the 1790s as protagonist David Braddee, aged nineteen, pilots his foster father's keelboat to a difficult landing at the frontier town of Pittsburgh, after a trip up the Mississippi and Ohio Rivers from New Orleans.

See also

Other novels that employ events of the Whiskey Rebellion:
 The Whiskey Rebels (2008)
 Wilderness Boy (1955)
 The Latimers (1898)

References

1939 American novels
Novels set in Pittsburgh
Fiction set in the 1790s